The Governor's Lady is a 1912 play written by Alice Bradley, directed by David Belasco and produced by Belasco and his son-in-law David Elliott. It is known for its unconventional set.

Production

After previews in Philadelphia and Washington The Governor's Lady opened at Belasco's Republic Theatre in New York on September 10, 1912. Emma Dunn and Emmett Corrigan starred as Mary and Dan Slade, Gladys Hanson played Katherine Strickland and Milton Sills played Robert Hayes. The three-act contemporary domestic drama dealt with topics of rising social status and the then-little-discussed topic of divorce. The reasonably well-reviewed and moderately commercially successful play ran 135 performances. It is primarily known as an example of Belasco's theatrical naturalism, because he recreated a Childs Restaurant on stage using materials and food from the actual restaurant chain rather than conventional representative stage scenery.

References

Bibliography
Dodge, Wendell Phillips, "Staging a Popular Restaurant", The Theatre Magazine, v.XVI n.140, October 1912, pp. 104 and x-xi.
"Early Fall Brings Many New Plays...There's 'The Governor's Lady' and Many Others", New York Times, Jun. 17, 1912, p. 9.
Essin, Christin, "Designing American Modernity: David Belasco's The Governor's Lady and Robert Edmond Jones's The Man Who Married a Dumb Wife", Theatre History Studies, v.29, Tuscaloosa: University of Alabama Press, 2009, pp. 32–51. 
"'Governor's Lady' Shown: Belasco Produces Play of Man and Wife's Rise from Poverty to Riches, The New York Times, May 2, 1912, p. 11.
Mantle, Burns and Garrison P. Sherwood, eds., The Best Plays of 1909-1919, Philadelphia: The Blakiston Company, 1947.
"The New Plays", The Theatre Magazine, v.XVI n.140, October 1912, pp. 100.
"Seeing This Play Seems Like Spying: Such a Sense of Intimacy Is Conveyed in 'The Governor's Lady,' at the Republic, Really Remarkable Acting, Emmett Corrigan and Emma Dunn Give Amazingly Fine Portrayals in a Realistic Belasco Production," (Play Review) New York Times, Sep. 11, 1912, p. 11.
White, Jr., Matthew, "The Stage", Munsey's Magazine, April 1912, v.47 n.1, p 827.

External links

 

Broadway plays
1912 plays
Childs Restaurants